Events in the year 1826 in Bolivia. The 1826 Constitution, the first constitution of Bolivia, was promulgated in November of this year.

Incumbents 
 Head of State (through 19 June): Antonio José de Sucre
 President (beginning from 19 June): Antonio José de Sucre
 Vice President (beginning from 19 November): Vacant
 Congress: General Constituent Congress

Events

January 
 13 January – The Army Secretariat is divided into two: one of the government and finance sections and the other military.

May 

 25 May
 The General Constituent Congress convenes in Chuquisaca.
 The State of Upper Peru, or Republic of Bolívar becomes the Bolivian Republic.
 26 May – The General Constituent Congress formally entrusts the powers of the executive branch to Antonio José de Sucre.
 28 May – Sucre is sworn in as head of the republic in a formal ceremony.

June 
 19 June – The limits of executive power, which since 26 May have been entrusted to Sucre, are established by the General Constituent Congress. "President of the Republic" is established as the title of the head of state.

July 
 1 July – Chuquisaca (Sucre) is established as the capital of Bolivia.

November 
 6 November – The General Constituent Congress sanctions the 1826 Constitution.
 19 November – President Sucre promulgates the 1826 Political Constitution of the State, declaring it to be in effect.

December 
 9 December – President Sucre is sworn in as the Constitutional President of the Republic.

Births

Deaths

Notes

Footnotes

Citations

Bibliography 

 
1800s in Bolivia
Bolivia
Bolivia
Years of the 19th century in Bolivia